Tomb of People's Heroes in Belgrade is located underneath the walls of the Belgrade Fortress. It holds the remains of four recipients of the Order of the People's Hero of SFR Yugoslavia.

It was built in 1948. Remains of Ivo Lola Ribar (1916–1943) and Ivan Milutinović (1901–1944) were buried there on 29 March 1948. Remains of Đuro Đaković (1886–1929) were buried on the 20th anniversary of his death on 29 April 1949. Moša Pijade (1890–1957) was buried in the tomb in March 1957.

Stevan Bodnarov, a sculptor from Belgrade, designed the busts of Ivo Lola Ribar, Ivan Milutinović and Đuro Đaković in 1949. The bust of Moša Pijade was designed by Slavoljub Stanković in 1959.

The tomb was declared Monument of Culture by the City Assembly of Belgrade in 1983.

Gallery

See also 
 Tomb of the People's Heroes, Zagreb
 Tomb of National Heroes (Ljubljana)

References 

Kalemegdan
Buildings and structures completed in 1948
Buildings and structures in Belgrade
Tourist attractions in Belgrade
Tombs
Yugoslav World War II monuments and memorials
Sculptures in Serbia
Yugoslav Serbian architecture
Cultural depictions of Yugoslav people
Stari Grad, Belgrade